The Women's single sculls competition at the 1996 Summer Olympics took place at Lake Lanier, Atlanta, United States of America. The event was held from 21 to 27 July 1996.

Heats
The winner in each heat advanced directly to the semi-finals. The remaining rowers must compete in the repechage for the remaining spots in semi-finals.

Heat 1

Heat 2

Heat 3

Repechage
First three rowers in each race advanced to Semifinal 1 or 2, the rest went to Final C.

Repechage 1

Repechage 2

Repechage 3

Semifinal
First three rowers from each semifinal advanced to Final A, while the others advanced to Final B.

Semifinal 1

Semifinal 2

Final

Final C

Final B

Final A

References

Sources

Rowing at the 1996 Summer Olympics
Olympic
Olymp